The 1st constituency of Martinique is a French legislative constituency in the Martinique département.

Deputies

Election results

2022

 
 
|-
| colspan="8" bgcolor="#E9E9E9"|
|-

2017

2012

2007

Sources and references
 French Interior Ministry results website: 

1